Youth With You (season 2), is a Chinese girl group elimination reality show, which premiered on 12 March 2020 on video platform iQiyi. The show is presented by Cai Xukun with Lalisa Manoban, Jony J and Ella Chen serving as the mentors. The show introduces 109 female trainees from different companies, who are voted for by viewers. The Top 9 trainees with the most votes in the final episode debuted in the Chinese girl group THE9.

Form

Positioning 
The series captures the pulse of contemporary pop culture and gives it a positive value of meaning, with a youthful attitude of "interpreting self" and "not defining self", showing the mentality and struggle of the girls when facing their dreams. Through the program, the audience can see the persistent efforts of young people, the youth passion released in the struggle, and the realization of the value of life on the road to dream.

Background 
In the production of Youth With You Season 2, iQiyi has achieved localized innovation. By creating high-quality youth inspirational examples, audience from all over the world can see the spirit and attitude of Chinese girls' youth and hard work, and hence enhance the influence of China's new era youth culture in overseas countries and users.

Scheme 
The show convenes 109 young girls with dreams who sing and dance well and will move towards the final debut through a four-month training and stage competition. Only 9 out of 109 girls can debut by forming a girl group, and they will be selected based on the votes of the youth producers.

Feature 
The "Concept X" proposed in this series implies the infinite possibilities of the show itself and the trainees. The emergence of original singer-songwriters and cross-fields trainees means that in the production chain of young idols, the cultivation of emotions, culture, and life experience, rather than just singing and dancing, is becoming more and more critical. The arrival of "X Mentor" will enrich the structure of mentors. In addition to the powerful union in professionalism, the X mentors also add a diverse perspective to the program. The youth producers' representative Cai Xukun appeared as a "warm heart senior". Besides offering strict professional guidance and emotional care, he also symbolized the power of role models.

Mentors 

KUN: Youth producers' representative

KUN, as the winner of Season 1, rarely participated in variety shows after his debut. This time, as a trainee who witnessed dreams, he regained the place where the dream began. Being the representative of youth producers is not only a retrospect of the very beginning mind but also the inheritance of dreams.

 Ella Chen: Music mentor

As a member of S.H.E, who debuted 19 years ago, Ella Chen's strength and professionalism are beyond doubt. In addition to helping the participants in music, her joining has a more profound meaning for the young and inexperienced trainees. From being called "tomboy" at the time of debut, to a fashionable wife and mother, she has always insisted on being herself. Her experience coincides with the idea of "Don't define, only create infinite possibilities" in Season 3, which is also the profound reason that the program chose her as the new music mentor.

 Lalisa Manoban: Dance mentor

Lalisa Manoban is the dance mentor of Season 2. As a member of the immensely popular South Korean girl group Blackpink, Lalisa Manoban has an amazing appearance as well as dance strength. As well as being cute and shy, she also has confidence. Plus, her bangs are known as "iron bangs" because she moves with such grace that they don't move.

 Jony J: Rap Mentor

As a leading figure of the Chinese rap industry, Jony J is the first rapper in China to hold a concert of ten thousand people. Since the audience often ponders his highly personalized lyrics, he is also known as "Hip-hop Poet".

X Mentors 

 Yoga Lin
 Silence Wang
 Wang Ziyi
 Zhu Zhengting
 Wang Linkai

Contestants 
Color key

 Top 9 of the week
 Top 9 of the week (Live Votes)
 Left the show
 Eliminated in Episode 9 + Episode 10
 Eliminated in Episode 16
 Eliminated in Episode 20
 Eliminated in Episode 23
 Final members of THE9

Contestant notes
 : Former contestant on Produce 101 China
 : Member of Dreamcatcher
 : Member of Nature
 : Member of BlueV (Unit by SNH48)
 : Member of 7SENSES (Unit by SNH48)
 : Member of Color Girls (Unit by SNH48)
 : Member of Fanxy Red
 : Member of Lady Bees
 : Former contestant on The Chinese Youth
 : Member of OYT GIRLS
 : Member of Hickey
 : Trainee under Lady Bees
 : Under a subsidiary label of Starship Entertainment
 : Under a subsidiary label of YG Entertainment
 : Former member of SHY48
 : Member of AKB48 Team SH
 : Former contestant on The Rap of China
 : Former contestant on Chinese Idol
 : Former contestant on The Next Top Bang
 : Former contestant on The Coming One Girls under the name Li Mo (李茉)
 : Member of Yep Girls
 : Member of MOI Girls
 : Former contestant on Girls, Fighting
 : Member of ACEMAX-RED
 : Former trainee under Banana Culture's Trainee 18
 : Former member of LEGAL HIGH
 : Former member of HelloGirls

Top 9

Elimination Chart 
Color key

Episodes

Episode 1 (12 March 2020)
Four mentors arrive at the welcome party and met the 109 trainees. In the last seasons, the mentors would only be able to meet the trainees on the stage of preliminary rating. This time the mentors get to meet them in advance to learn about their characters and backgrounds so that they can talk with the trainees in a better way. Every trainee introduces herself at the party and seated herself around a very long table next to each other. On the next day, the four mentors give their performance on the stage for the trainees. Dance mentor Lisa performs In the Name of Love and Attention; rap mentor Jony J performs My Man; vocal mentor Ella performs How Old Are You; and youth producers' representative Kun performs YOUNG. Then comes the stage of preliminary rating for the trainees. The trainees who choose the same song are automatically paired one-to-one and compete against each other. The one-to-one performance makes it easier to observe and compare the trainees. The mentors will then rank them from Class A to F according to their performance.

Episode 2 (14 March 2020) 
The stage of preliminary rating continues. Kong Xueer becomes the first trainee that is assigned to Class A. She and Zhao Xiaotang talk about being trainees who have already debuted before and how their experiences make them more mature and independent, resonating many trainees who have similar experiences. Wang Qing and Zhang Yu perform Theme Song of Love using their  unique style and make all the mentors and trainees laugh a lot. Wang Qing's management of facial expression and her overall performance touch the judges and get she into Class A. A fierce battle rises within Shangguan Xiai, An Qi and Xu Jiaqi. All of them prove themselves by their solo performances and are all assigned to A class. Chua Zhuoyi bursts into tears when she shares how she feels about the odium from people on the Internet towards her. They think that her experience makes her "unqualified" for being a member of a girls' team. She insists that she doesn't live in the comments at all, and she will love herself, be herself, and go ahead bravely. Vocal mentor Ella says that girls shouldn't have only one look, and a girls' team shouldn't be defined, so Youth With You Season 2 will let girls' team have an evolution.

Episode 3 (19 March 2020) 
The stage of preliminary rating continues. Duan Xiaowei's performance of new Japanese sign dance amazes everyone. Then she is assigned to Class A. After performing, "chatty" Yu Shuxin spends 3 minutes explaining how she tries to show her feelings through acting in the show, but Kun points out that Shuxin is trying too hard and it is better if she just highlights particular parts. As time goes, sleepiness comes quietly, but Yu Yan's stunning opening of her show awakes everyone, and she is assigned to Class A. Only Liu Yuxin chooses No Joke, so she does not have a rival. Her perfect performance wins mentor over. Lisa says this is what she has been waiting for, and Yuxin aced all the aspects. Everyone is very surprised about Qinniu Zhengwei coming to this stage, but Qin thinks it is difficult to understand someone through the Internet, so she wants to show more about herself through the program. The battle between AKB48 and SNH48 also attracts everyone's attention as the two groups are from the same system. Though they already have some achievement in their circle, Mo Han says they are in a status of closed-loop development, so they want to get out of the loop and make progress step by step. Ella points out that both groups' performances are quite formulized and lack personal characteristics. They should think about what kind of girl group members they want to become to let people remember each of them. Everyone in these two teams is assigned to Class D.

Episode 4 (21 March 2020) 
The stage of preliminary rating continues. It begins with the competition within the original rap team. Jony J says rappers in this program are like playing away from home because this is the home for trainees. He is stricter than the trainees expect. When he criticizes Gia's performance, everyone is quite shocked. As a professional rapper, NINEONE has released over 30 original pieces, but Jony J says the song she chooses is not competent enough in such a competitive part because it doesn't show what she is capable of. Kun and Jony J have different opinions on Xie Keyin's ranking. Kun thinks Xie Keyin deserves Class A based on her performance as a whole. Still, Jony believes it is better to give her a signal that she is good, but not good enough, so they assign her to Class B.  After the performance of rap team, Lin Xiaozhai attracts the trainees' attention because she is already a very famous influencer and owns a successful business. Xiaozhai says she chooses to come here because she thinks an Internet influencer's career is very fragile, so she wants to develop more skills. The performance of the girls from Yuehua ENT is great as a whole, but the mentors are not impressed by any of them as they don't have distinct characteristics, so all of them are assigned to Class C.

The preliminary rating finally ends. The first mission for the trainees is position assessment. There are three positions: Vocal, Dance and Rap. At first, every trainee gets to choose the position they want. Different songs are for different positions, but only trainees in Class A has the right to select the song they prefer. Out of everyone's expectation, Shangguan chooses Kissing the Future of Love because she wants to show the audience that she can give everything they want. After choosing the song they want, Class A trainees can also select the teammates they want. The order of selection is decided by random draw. The trainee that is drawn can finish her selection of teammates at once. After Class A trainees finish their grouping, there are still several songs left. For all the left songs, they are chosen by picking up balls. However, if some trainees are not chosen to perform the remaining songs in their position, they will then be assigned to other groups.

After the grouping ends, responsibility assignment comes. Every group needs to choose a leader and centre. Everyone wants the centre position, so the battle for it begins. For the group Oh Boy, Wang Chengxuan and Shen Jie battles for the centre position, but Chengxuan loses in the voting because the three sisters of Jie, Shen Bing, Shen Qing, Shen Yu all vote for her. The discussion becomes quite intense. Jie's sisters think Chengxuan and Jie are equally matched, but Jie has a bright spot and catches their eyes. However, the other two members don't agree because they think Chengxuan's level is way above the rest of the members. In the end, the sisters persuade others, and Jie becomes the centre.

Missions

Mission 1: Position Evaluation 
Color key

 Winner
 Leader
 Center
 Leader & Center

Mission 2: Group Battle 
Color key

 Winner
 Leader
 Center
 Leader & Center

Mission 3: Theme Song Assessment 
Color key

 Winner
 Leader
 Center
 Leader & Center

Mission 4: Cooperation Stage 
Color key

 Leader
 Center
 Leader & Center

Mission 5: Final Stage Performance 
Color key

 Center

Discography

Singles

Production 
Due to the COVID-19 pandemic, the filming location, Guangdong, has been sealed up and filming has been halted since 22 January.

Along with Cai Xukun and Jony J, 5 girls —Xu Jiaqi, Shangguan Xiai, An Qi, Kong Xueer and Wang Qing — participated in promotions for Youth With You Season 2 on Happy Camp on 29 February episode.

Controversy

Shen Bing's Controversy 
On 25 March, a man who claimed to be Shen Bing's boyfriend posted a statement that he had been seeing her since September 2019 and hidden his marriage from her. According to him, Shen Bing had made threatening comments to his wife after learning of his marriage. Thereafter, Shen Bing withdrew from the show, stating that she had had no idea about his marriage, contradicting what her boyfriend had said.

Final Episode's Controversy 
On the final episode of Youth With You Season 2, when the song "Hunt" was performed live, the audio quality during the live stage was poor and some of the trainee's voices couldn't be heard. Many netizens were disappointed by the poor audio and the trainee's poor vocals, and trended the topic on Weibo, with many calling it a "car accident". When trainee Yu Shuxin was announced a member of THE9, she sang a song to prove her vocal abilities after many found her performance in "Hunt" disappointing.

The same day, Dove posted in Weibo to congratulate Liu Yuxin for becoming the first in Youth With You Season 2 before the result was announced. Then, it was deleted. The next day, Dove clarified that the staff will send out congratulations in advance.

THE9 
Winners of the season formed the group THE9. THE9 released their first EP on 10 August which contained the lead title track "SphinX" along with "Not Me".

References 

2020 Chinese television seasons
 
Ella Chen